Abolhassan Khamoushi is an Iranian conservative politician who served as the caretaker for the ministry of energy in the cabinet of Mir-Hossein Mousavi.

In December 2001, he was appointed as head of the Petroleum Engineering and Development Company (PEDEC), a subordinate to the state-owned National Iranian Oil Company.

References 

Living people
Islamic Coalition Party politicians
Islamic Republican Party politicians
Government ministers of Iran
Year of birth missing (living people)